Lioscincus is a genus of skinks, lizards in the family Scincidae. The genus is endemic to New Caledonia.

Species
There are two species that are recognized as being valid.
Lioscincus steindachneri  – white-lipped forest skink, Steindachner's ground skink
Lioscincus vivae

References

Further reading
Bocage JVB du (1873). "III. Sur quelques Sauriens nouveaux de la Nouvelle Calédonie et de l'Australie ". Jornal de Sciencias Mathematicas Physicas e Naturaes, Lisboa 4 (9): 228–232. (Lioscincus, new genus, p. 228). (in French).

 
Skinks of New Caledonia
Endemic fauna of New Caledonia
Lizard genera
Taxa named by José Vicente Barbosa du Bocage